Ott Lepland is Estonian singer Ott Lepland's first solo studio album after his work as a child singer in the 1990s. The album was released on 13 April 2010 in Estonia, and was presented in a series of concerts beginning 16 April in Tallinn.

References

2010 albums